The Gulf of Antalya is a large bay of the northern Levantine Sea, in the eastern Mediterranean Sea south of Antalya Province, Turkey. It includes some of the main seaside resorts of Turkey, also known as the "Turkish Riviera".

Antalya
Antalya
Antalya
Landforms of Antalya Province
Turkish Riviera